Robert or Bob Myers may refer to:

Politics
Robert Myers Jr. (born 1983), American state senator in Alaska
Robert L. Myers (politician) (1928–1993), American politician in Pennsylvania
 Robert Edward William Myers (1947–2008), Canadian politician in Saskatchewan
Robert Hill Myers (1856–1922), Canadian politician and judge in Manitoba

Sports

American football
Robert Myers (offensive lineman) (born 1991), American offensive lineman
Robert L. Myers (coach) (1887–1953), American football coach
Bobby Myers (American football) (born 1976), American football player

Others sports
Bob Myers (born 1975), basketball executive and former college basketball player
Bob Myers (footballer) (born 1930), Australian rules footballer
Bobby Myers (racing driver) (1927–1957), American stock car driver

Others
Robert Myers (physicist), theoretical physicist
Robert J. Myers (1912–2010), American actuary who co-created the American Social Security program
Robert E. Myers (record producer) (1912–1976), classical producer and artists & repertoire specialist
Robert ÆOLUS Myers, American composer, performer and producer
Robert Manson Myers, author; winner of a National Book Award

See also
Robert Meyer (disambiguation)
Robert Meyers (disambiguation)